Penshurst is a suburb in southern Sydney, in the state of New South Wales, Australia. Penshurst is located 17 kilometres south of the Sydney central business district and is part of the St George area.

Penshurst features low to medium-density housing. It has a predominantly older population however it is increasingly being populated by a new generation of migrant families who are attracted by its proximity to Hurstville.

History
Penshurst was named after Penshurst, Kent, England. Originally part of the land grant to Robert Townson (1763–1827), the land was acquired in 1830 by John Connell, who left it to his grandsons J.C. and E.P. Laycock. Connell's Bush was subdivided by the Laycocks and the western part sold to Thomas Sutcliffe Mort.

The early work in the area was timber-cutting and small farming. The railway station opened 17 May 1890. A large portion of Penshurst located south of the railway line is referred to as the MacRae's Estate, as it was once owned by the MacRae family. This particular area is now between Laycock Road and Grove Avenue, and Hillcrest and Railway Parade. The original homestead is still present on Laycock Road, along with a caretakers house for the stables. McRaes Reserve used to have a river running through it and the path of that river is now replaced with an underground rainwater system.

Heritage listings 
Penshurst has a number of heritage-listed sites, including:
 663-665 King Georges Road: West Maling
 Laycock Road: Penshurst Reservoirs

Commercial area
The main shopping centre is located around Penshurst railway station on Penshurst Street, Bridge Street and The Strand. Commercial developments are also found along Forest Road and King Georges Road. The Penshurst RSL Club is a centre of social activity. The area also contains The Gamesmen Store and Museum, dedicated to video games since 1982.

Transport
Penshurst railway station is on the Illawarra Line of the Sydney Trains network. It is approximately 27 minutes from Sydney Central via train. The main roads through Penshurst are King Georges Road and Forest Road. Punchbowl Bus Company also operates bus services 941 and 943 in Penshurst.

Places of worship
St Declan's Roman Catholic Church
St John Anglican Church
St Andrew Presbyterian
Penshurst Uniting Church
Penshurst Mosque (Australian Bosnian Islamic Society)
Penshurst Jehovahs Witnesses Kingdom Hall
Penshurst Assemblies of God Church
Revival Life Centre
Penshurst General Church of New Jerusalem

Schools
 George's River Girls High School
 Marist College Penshurst
 St Declans Catholic Primary School
 Penshurst Public School
 Penshurst West Primary School 
 Hurstville Grove Infants School

Sport and recreation
Penshurst local attractions include an Aquatic Centre, a park and tennis courts. Penshurst RSL Junior Rugby League Club, part of the St. George District Junior Rugby League competition, is a rugby league club that operates from HV Evatt Park in nearby Lugarno, New South Wales.

Penshurst has a local cricket club and play in the St George District Cricket Association and have been established for over 50 years.

They are based at Olds Park which also includes their soccer club.
 
Penshurst Park and Hurstville Aquatic Leisure Centre are located on King Georges Road.

Parks:
 Penshurst Park
 McRaes Park
 Gifford Park

Population

Demographics
In the 2016 Census, there were 12,786 people in Penshurst. The most common ancestries were Chinese 20.4%, English 13.2%, Australian 12.1%, Nepalese 5.9% and Irish 5.3%. 47.4% of people were born in Australia. The next most common countries of birth were China 13.8%, Nepal 6.6%, Hong Kong 2.5%, Philippines 2.2% and India 2.2%.  42.2% of people spoke only English at home. Other languages spoken at home included Mandarin 12.0%, Cantonese 9.3%, Nepali 6.9%, Greek 3.5% and Arabic 2.9%. The most common responses for religious affiliation were No Religion 25.2%, Catholic 23.3%, Anglican 8.4% and Hinduism 8.1%.

Notable residents
 Jessica Abbott (b. 1985)—Australian swimmer and medalist at 2002 Commonwealth Games
 Ruby Olive Boye-Jones (1891–1990)—coastwatcher
 Jack Brabham
 Tony Currenti
 Sue Denison - received the Medal of the Order of Australia for services to nursing as a nurse practitioner, and services to the Nundle district 
 Arthur McGuinness (1878–1970)—schoolteacher and union leader
 Jock Marshall (1911–1967)—professor of zoology
 Ken Rosewall
 Fleur Mellor, Olympic gold medallist, 1956

References

 
Suburbs of Sydney
Georges River Council